Solomon Jeff Atse alias M2 is a Ghanaian singer-songwriter, recording artist and rapper. One of his singles "Blow My Mind" featuring Estarr was played all across Ghana after breaking through the top 10 music of the week in 2011.

Discography

Major singles
Décalé Coupé
True love
Igbésé
Ballin
Hold my hand
Do
Sweeter than sugar
Your lover
Best friend
I Understand
Wynd 4 Me
Money Everywhere
Blow My Mind                
Sample
Konogo.

References

External links
https://www.reverbnation.com/a_m24/song/25207405-konongo
https://www.reverbnation.com/page_object/page_object_photos/artist_4303347?photo=33630989

Ghanaian male singer-songwriters
21st-century Ghanaian male singers
21st-century Ghanaian singers
People from Accra
University of Ghana alumni
Year of birth missing (living people)
Living people